The Loppem Agreements refers to a series of private meetings held by King Albert I at the Castle of Loppem in Loppem (Lophem), West Flanders on 11 to 14 November 1918 about the future political order in Belgium after the end of World War I. 

Convened in the aftermath of the Armistice of 11 November 1918 in the days before the King's triumphant return to Brussels which had been occupied since 1914, the Loppem meetings consisted of a series of private audiences with prominent socialist and liberal politicians and notables such as Edward Anseele, Paul-Émile Janson, and Émile Francqui who had become prominent in German-occupied Belgium. A number of sensitive political topics were discussed, including universal suffrage, labour rights, and the status of Dutch speakers, notably in higher education. The meetings preceded the creation of a national unity government under Léon Delacroix on 21 November which included liberals and socialists and marked the end of nearly four decades of exclusive Catholic political dominance in Belgian politics. The following day, 22 November, the King returned to Brussels and publicly announced a new legislative programme to include the introduction of universal suffrage and the creation of a Dutch-language university.

The new measures appalled conservative Catholics who had been absent from the discussion at Loppem and who succeeded in delaying some of the new reforms. On learning of the consultations, some denounced it as a "coup d'état" in which the King, either at his own initiative or under socialist pressure amid the November Revolution in Germany, had overstepped his constitutional powers to favour the political left. The King was forced to issue a public letter on 10 February 1930 clarifying his account of the discussions.

See also
Red Week (Netherlands), socialist unrest in November 1918

References

Further reading

1918 in Belgium
Political history of Belgium
Socialism in Belgium
November 1918 events
Hundred Days Offensive